Onorato Candiota (... - after 1808) was an Italian professor of philosophy and math at the Real Convitto di Bari, in Bari, Italy. He lived between the 18th and 19th centuries. The exact dates and places of birth and death are currently unknown, even though it is known that he was from Altamura, Italy. He's best known for his participation in the so-called Altamuran Revolution (1799). He died short after 1808.

In 1796 he was appointed as member of Accademia dei Georgofili in Florence. Moreover, following the founding of Istituto nazionale della Repubblica Napoletana in 1799, he was also appointed as member of that academy in the class of physics, natura history and chemistry. He was also member of the Royal Society of Encouragement to Natural Sciences of Naples.

A street in Altamura, Italy has been named after him (via Onorato Candiota).

Altamuran Revolution 
Onorato Candiota, together with his brother Gian Giacomo Candiota, was from a wealthy family. During the Altamuran Revolution (1799), he defended the city of Altamura and, because of this, he was jailed together with his brother in the prison Forte di Brindisi; he was released together with the other people imprisoned, thanks to the Treaty of Florence (1801). When they came back, they looked very different and they weren't recognized by their relatives.

Works

References

Bibliography 
 
 
 
 

Italian philosophers
18th-century Italian mathematicians
People from Altamura
Parthenopean Republic